Sus is a neighborhood in the Pune Metropolitan Area. It is located in the north-west area of the city. Earlier a small village, Sus is being increasingly urbanized. The neighbourhood falls under the jurisdiction of the Pune Municipal Corporation.

Sus is well connected to important roads. The Deu Road–Katraj bypass is just off Sus, enabling easy connectivity to Pimpri-Chinchwad and the Mumbai–Pune Expressway.

History
Sus is a newly developed location after the expansion of Pune city limits in the late 1990s. Real estate in the area has increased tenfold in the past decade in order to meet the growing demand of residents.

Geography and Climate

Sus lies in a valley and is surrounded by hills both sides. Surrounding hills include the Baner Hill, Pashan Hill, Sutarwadi Hill and the Lavale Hills.

Sus shares the climate of Pune City, with warm summers, moderate rainfall and moderate winters.

Education and Research
Due to the growth in population, many private schools have been set up in Sus and surroundings. Some notable schools include:
Vidya Valley School - ICSE 
Tree House High School - ICSE 
Apple Blossom Nursery School
Lokseva e-school

A number of colleges have been established in Sus.
Abhinav College of Arts (ACR)
Indian Institute of Science Education and Research (IISER)
International School of Business and Media (ISBM)
Maharashtra Institute of Technology - School of Distant Learning (MIT-SDL) 
Institute of Hospitality Management, Research & Development (IHMRD)
Symbiosis Institute of Technology (SIT)
Foundation of Liberal and Management Education (FLAME)

Gallery

References

Neighbourhoods in Pune
Villages in Pune district